Sanford and Son is an American sitcom, based on the BBC sitcom Steptoe and Son. It aired every Friday from 8:00-8:30 PM (EST) on NBC from January 14, 1972, to March 25, 1977. The show starred Redd Foxx and Demond Wilson in the leading roles. The series follow Fred G. Sanford, and his son Lamont Sanford as they operated a junk and antique dealership out of their home in Los Angeles.

Series overview

Episodes

Season 1 (1972)

Season 2 (1972–73)

Season 3 (1973–74)
Note: Twenty-five episodes were written for Season Three, but the nineteenth was never taped due to contract disputes with Redd Foxx and producers of the show. The negotiations led to Foxx being absent from the last six episodes, but he returned to the series at the beginning of Season Four.

Season 4 (1974–75)

Season 5 (1975–76)

Season 6 (1976–77)

References

Sanford and Son
Sanford and Son episodes